Senator Cornett may refer to:

Abbie Cornett (born 1966), Nebraska State Senate
Marshall E. Cornett (1898–1947), Oregon State Senate